The Fairbairn Dam is an earth-filled embankment dam across the Nogoa River, located southwest of  in Central Queensland, Australia. Constructed in 1972 for the primary purpose of irrigation, the impoundment created by the dam serves as one of the major potable water supplies for the region and assists with some flood mitigation.

Its capacity is approximately three times larger than Sydney Harbour. Maraboon is the Aboriginal for "where the black ducks fly".

Location and features
Commenced in 1968, the dam was engineered by Snowy Mountains Hydro-Electric Authority and completed in December 1972 for the purposes of irrigation and water storage. Storage of water commenced in January 1972 and the dam filled and overflowed for the first time two years later.

About 300 irrigators are supplied with water for cotton, citrus and other horticulture operations. The dam is relatively shallow with large areas of standing timber. There are no boating restrictions and one concrete boat ramp.

Water from the Fairbairn Dam is released down the Nogoa River to the Selma Weir for supply to the town of Emerald. Supplies are diverted by pipelines to the towns of Blackwater, Bluff, Tieri, Dysart and Middlemount. Water from the dam also supplies coal mining developments on the Bowen Basin.

The dam and reservoir are operated by SunWater.

A 50th birthday celebration for the dam is being held on Saturday 21 May 2022 sponsored by Sunwater and the Central Highlands Regional Council.

Water storage levels
In July 2003, cotton farmers who were reliant on the dam for irrigation had their water allocation cut by 75%. In November 2006, the dam had reached its lowest level ever—just 14% of total capacity. Over that summer low inflows and high evaporation rates had dropped levels to 12%.

On 18 January 2008 water in the reservoir overflowed the dam spillway for the first time in 17 years, due to heavy local rain. Downstream 2,700 residents had to be evacuated due to flooding. Seven days earlier, the lake was operating at 29% of full capacity.

This would make the dam approximately 3 times the storage of Sydney Harbour in normal conditions and 4 times in extreme flood.

On 29 December 2019 the Fairbairn Dam was at 9.6% capacity, the previous record low capacity was in December 2006 at 11.8%. In December 2019 the Central Highlands Regional Council made the decision to stay on level 1 water restrictions whilst they were undertaking a review of their trigger levels for water restrictions. A record low of 7.39% was reached in 2020.

In late 2022, the dam reached 40% of capacity, allowing farmers to access full water allocations.

Fishing
The lake has been stocked with barramundi, Mary River cod, southern saratoga, bass and silver perch. Eel-tailed catfish, spangled perch, red claw crayfish, sooty grunter and golden perch Georgia fish are additionally present.

See also

List of dams and reservoirs in Queensland

References

Reservoirs in Queensland
Buildings and structures in Central Queensland
Dams in Queensland
Embankment dams
1972 establishments in Australia
Dams completed in 1972
Floods in Queensland